The 1984–85 Segunda División season saw 20 teams participate in the second flight Spanish league. UD Las Palmas, Cádiz CF and Celta de Vigo were promoted to Primera División. UD Salamanca, Granada CF, CD Calvo Sotelo and CF Lorca Deportiva were relegated to Segunda División B.

Teams

Final table

Results

Segunda División seasons
2
Spain